Soldier's Girl is a 2003 biographical drama film written by Ron Nyswaner and directed by Frank Pierson. It is based on a story of the relationship between Barry Winchell and Calpernia Addams and the events that led up to Barry's murder by a fellow soldier, starring Troy Garity as Winchell and Lee Pace as Addams. The film premiered on Showtime on May 31, 2003.

Soldier's Girl was listed among the ten best Television Programs of the Year (2003) by the American Film Institute.

Plot
Barry is a private with the 101st Airborne Division of the United States Army, stationed at Fort Campbell, Kentucky, while Calpernia works as a showgirl at a transgender revue in Nashville, Tennessee. Barry's roommate Justin Fisher brings Barry to the club where Calpernia performs. When Barry and Calpernia start dating, Fisher, out of jealousy, participates in spreading rumors about Barry's alleged affair, which appeared to be a violation of the military's "don't ask, don't tell" policy that forbids discussion of sexual orientation of military personnel. Barry faces increasing harassment and pressure, which explodes into violence over a Fourth of July weekend after Barry easily beats Calvin Glover in a fight. While Calpernia performs in a pageant in Nashville, Barry is beaten to death in his sleep by Glover with a baseball bat given by Fisher. The film ends with a discussion of the aftermath.

Cast

Production
Soldier's Girl was filmed in Toronto and Barrie in Ontario, Canada.

Reception

Critical response
On Rotten Tomatoes, the film holds an approval rating of 88% based on reviews from 8 critics.

John Leonard of New York magazine wrote: "All three principal performances are superb."

Carin Gorrell in Psychology Today calls Soldier's Girl a "gut-wrenching and provacative work" adding that Troy Garity's "performance is so strong that it's nearly impossible to react without sympathy"

In Variety David Rooney wrote: "Both Garity and newcomer Pace give complex, controlled performances, full-bodied and richly empathetic, making the union between this unlikely couple seem entirely plausible and natural".

Accolades

See also

Further reading

References

External links
 

2003 television films
2003 films
2003 independent films
2003 biographical drama films
2003 crime drama films
2003 LGBT-related films
2003 romantic drama films
American biographical drama films
American crime drama films
American LGBT-related television films
American romantic drama films
American television films
Canadian biographical drama films
Canadian crime drama films
Canadian LGBT-related television films
Canadian romantic drama films
Canadian drama television films
Crime films based on actual events
Crime television films
English-language Canadian films
Films about the United States Army
Films about trans women
Films directed by Frank Pierson
Films scored by Jan A. P. Kaczmarek
Films set in the 1990s
Films set in Kentucky
Films shot in Toronto
LGBT and military-related mass media
Biographical films about LGBT people
LGBT-related romantic drama films
Peabody Award-winning broadcasts
Romance films based on actual events
Romance television films
Showtime (TV network) films
2000s English-language films
2000s American films
2000s Canadian films